Alexander George Kenyon (born 17 July 1992) is an English footballer who plays as a midfielder for National League North club Chester.

Career
Kenyon began his career with Everton before being released in the summer of 2008 and he then joined non-league Chorley. Kenyon then joined Lancaster City in the summer of 2009 before signing for Conference Premier side Stockport County in May 2012. After suffering relegation with County in 2012–13 he joined League Two side Morecambe on 27 June 2013. 

He made his Football League debut on 10 August 2013 in a 1–1 draw with Torquay United. He signed a new contract in February 2014 which runs through to June 2016. On 28 June 2016 Kenyon signed a new 12-month deal with the club. In July 2019 he signed a new one-year contract with Morecambe.

Morecambe did not renew Kenyon's contract, making him a free agent in 2021. Scunthorpe United then signed him on a one-year deal.

Kenyon left Scunthorpe United on 28 January 2022 by mutual consent.

In March 2022, Kenyon signed for Scottish Championship side Ayr United.

In July 2022, Kenyon returned to England to join National League North club Chester.

Honours 
 Morecambe
 EFL League Two play-offs: 2021

References

External links 

 

1992 births
Living people
English footballers
Association football midfielders
Chorley F.C. players
Lancaster City F.C. players
Stockport County F.C. players
Morecambe F.C. players
Scunthorpe United F.C. players
Ayr United F.C. players
Chester F.C. players
National League (English football) players
English Football League players
Scottish Professional Football League players